Captain Arthur Noel Edwards  (10 December 1883 – 25 May 1915) was an English polo player who participated in the 1911  and 1913 International Polo Cup as an alternate.

Origins
He was born on 10 December 1883, the second son of Arthur Edwards of Beech Hill Park, Waltham Abbey, Essex, by his wife Hilda Tennant, a daughter of Robert Tennant (1828–1900) of Chapel House in the parish of Conistone, Yorkshire, Member of Parliament for Leeds. His brother was the cricketer Guy Janion Edwards (1881–1962).

Career
Arthur Noel Edwards participated in the 1911 and 1913 International Polo Cup at the Meadowbrook Polo Club as an alternate.

He was a Captain in the 9th Queen's Royal Lancers and died in World War I on 25 May 1915 as the result of a poison gas attack by the Germans during the Second Battle of Ypres. He was buried in Bailleul Communal Cemetery Extension.

He was later re-interred in High Beech, and there is a memorial to him in the Church of the Holy Innocents, High Beach, Epping, in Essex.

References

1883 births
1915 deaths
English polo players
International Polo Cup
British Army personnel of World War I
British military personnel killed in World War I
9th Queen's Royal Lancers officers
Burials in Essex